A transformer is a device that transfers electrical energy from one circuit to another.

Transformer may also refer to:

Art and entertainment
 Transformer (Lou Reed album), 1972
 Transformer (Bruce Kulick album), 2003
 "Transformer", a song by Gnarls Barkley from St. Elsewhere
 Transformer (film), a 2017 Canadian documentary
 Transformer, a 1986 Sega arcade game

Science and technology
 Transformer (gene), a family of genes that regulate sex determination in some insects
 Transformer (flying car), a DARPA military project
 Asus Transformer, a series of hybrid tablet computers
 "Electronic transformer", a term commonly used in extra-low-voltage lighting applications for a switched-mode power supply.
 TrikeBuggy Transformer, a U.S. powered hang glider
 Transformer (machine learning model), a deep learning architecture

Other uses
 Transformer (spirit-being), an indigenous tradition of the Pacific Northwest of North America
 Prada Transformer, a building in Seoul, South Korea

See also
 Transformers (disambiguation)